The 1960 United States presidential election in Missouri took place on November 8, 1960, as part of the 1960 United States presidential election. Voters chose 13 representatives, or electors, to the Electoral College, who voted for president and vice president.

In the nation's third-closest race, Missouri was won by Senator John F. Kennedy (D–Massachusetts), running with Senator Lyndon B. Johnson, with 50.26% of the popular vote against incumbent Vice President Richard Nixon (R–California), running with United States Ambassador to the United Nations Henry Cabot Lodge, Jr., with 49.74% of the popular vote. , this is the last election in which Osage County voted for a Democratic Presidential candidate. It also remains the most recent election in which a Northern Democrat has carried Missouri. The only subsequent Democratic nominees to carry the state have been from the South (Lyndon B. Johnson of Texas, Jimmy Carter of Georgia, and Bill Clinton of  neighboring Arkansas)--although Northern Democrat Barack Obama of neighboring Illinois came very close to winning it in 2008, losing it by a razor-thin margin of 0.13% and fewer than 4,000 votes.

A 101,000-vote margin in Kennedy's favor in St. Louis was nearly 10 times Kennedy's statewide margin.

Results

Results by county

See also
 United States presidential elections in Missouri

References

Missouri
1960
1960 Missouri elections